South Side Fire Station No. 3, at 1324 S. Minnesota Ave. in Sioux Falls, South Dakota, was built in 1931.  It was listed on the National Register of Historic Places in 1984.

It is a one-story red brick building, built around 1931 for the National Youth Administration.  It became a fire station in 1945.  It was sold by the city in 1964 and became a coffee house.  In 1983 it was home of the Bernice Johnson School of Modeling.

References

Fire stations on the National Register of Historic Places in South Dakota
National Register of Historic Places in Sioux Falls, South Dakota
Fire stations completed in 1931
National Youth Administration
1931 establishments in South Dakota